Mimoza Nestorova-Tomić (born 1929) is a Macedonian architect, planner, and urban designer, who played a significant role in the masterplan and reconstruction of Skopje after the 1963 earthquake. Initially she worked specifically in the team for social planning with Polservice, the Polish consultants, alongside Kenzo Tange, the winner of a United Nations international competition for the reconstruction of Skopje. In the period 1986-1989 Nestorova-Tomić was director of the director and design architect of the City Institute for Planning in Skopje. As a female architect working within socialist Yugoslavia, Nestorova-Tomić presents a different trajectory to her counterparts in the West.

Early life and education

Nestorova-Tomić was born in Struga, a small town in the west of the Republic of Macedonia, where her family provided a privileged support for her childhood and education. She attended the Ohrid High School (rather than her local school in her hometown Struga), and her family financed the first three years of her studies in Belgrade, the post second World War capital of the Federation of Yugoslavia, until she received a scholarship. She completed her architectural studies with the major project on ‘Urban resolution for the touristic district Trsija in Ohrid,’ under the supervision of Professor Branko Maksimovic in Belgrade. This sense of a world open for her education and learning became a pattern in Nestorova-Tomić career and she travelled widely.

Early work
The architectural career of Mimoza Nestorova-Tomić is summarized in the first volume of the 2004 encyclopedic publication Градителите во Македонија (City Builders in Macedonia), which covers the pioneering period of architectural production in the Republic of Macedonia. The author and editor of the publication, well known architect Georgi Konstantinovski, has structured the book such that each individual architect is represented on a double page spread, no matter their hierarchy or status, illustrating a socialist form of equality in representation.

In the period between 1954 and 1962, after a brief period in the office of Drago Galić in Zagreb, Nestorova-Tomić pursued a series of study-related practical training in France (1957) and Britain (1960 funded by British Council), and in 1964 with her husband, Lyubomir Tomić, to the USA (New York, Berkeley, and Chicago).

During this time Nestorova-Tomić worked with her husband on the design of the apartment block in Albert Einstein Street, in Skopje.

Collaboration
In 1964 Nestorova-Tomić joined the Institute of Urbanism and Architecture in Skopje where in a team with architectural conservationists, consultants, and engineers, she worked on the project for the reconstruction and restoration of the Stara Charshija (Old Bazaar), a large area of Ottoman urban morphology, including significant Ottoman architectural edifices, mosques and hamams, on the north side of the Vardar river at the foothills of the Kale Fortress, in Skopje. This was a key component of the reconstruction of Skopje. It was followed with the project on the restoration of the historical Ottoman structure of Sulei Inn. With the team of the architect, Arsovski, Nestorova-Tomić on the department store, ‘Skopjanka’ in Skopje.

One highlight of her career is the design for the Museum of Macedonia (1972, Skopje) for which she collaborated with the architect, Muratovski. Due to its innovative setting on the site within the context of the Stara Charishija, the museum project has been noted in a few publications including, Tokarev’s book, 100 Years of Modern Architecture, Volume 3: Contributions of Macedonia and Yugoslavia (1918-1990)
and Kulić’s 2011 book on Yugoslavian architecture, Modernism In-Between.

Awards
In 2011, Nestorova-Tomić was the recipient of the Andreja Damjanov award, a national award given to an individual who has made significant contribution over a sustained period.

Nestorova-Tomić has been a model architectural figure in the Republic of Macedonia. In the first volume of Konstantinovski’s encyclopaedic publication, one of the very few publications on Macedonian architects, Mimoza Nestorova-Tomić is one of 39 female architects out of 276 architects represented. Along with a few other women, Nestorova-Tomić played a significant role in the production of Macedonian architectural modernity.

References

1929 births
Living people
Women architects
Architects from Skopje
People from Struga
Yugoslav architects